Panhtwar was the legendary queen regnant of Beikthano, the ancient city of the Pyu Kingdom. She was considered to be a strong, spiritual lady of war and fame.

Legend
According to legend, Panhtwar was the only daughter of Sula Thambawa, a son of Maha Thado Yarzar (King Naga Naing), the legendary King of Tagaung Kingdom, and Sanda Muhki, an Ogress-nymph from Lanka Dipa.

Her history records the wars period between Sri Ksetra and Beikthano and of the fighting that took place. Beikthano was created for Panhtwar by the Hindu god Vishnu because she was assumed as the younger sister of Vishnu in previous life. Beikthano is a small kingdom in ruled by Queen Panhtwar. The other kingdoms are larger and stronger, so they want to come and take over hers. Every time they tried, even though they outnumbered her kingdom in men and equipment, they never succeeded. Because the queen was able to repel all her enemy forces with the help of magical drum named "Atula Sidaw"(), gave by Indra, the King of the Celestials. When Queen Panhtwar banged onto the drum, the magic drum would be sounded making the water of the Yan Pe River (lit. Repelling enemies river) to rise rapidly and flood the surrounding plain so that no attacking army could cross it. 

 
One day, King of Sri Ksetra Duttabaung made some of his subjects disguise themselves as imitate monks and they worshipped her so she let them stay in the palace. Then, they sabotaged the drums so the alarm could not be set off. The next day, when the soldiers attacked, the drum did not work when she hit it. She then lost her kingdom and so the king took her as his wife and also took the whole kingdom.  Duttabaung was the son of Maha Thamawa, the twin brother of Sula Thamawa. So, Duttabaung was a cousin of Panhtwar. The King's other consorts were jealous of her beauty, and conspired against her. They told Duttabaung that her loveliness was a magic trick, and that in fact she resembled a horrible ogre. The King unfortunately believed in what they said and abandoned her. So because she is resilient, she wanted her kingdom back and couldn't take on the place of Queen of this kingdom she did not know so she was not happy. So every day, she makes the King lose power in some way as much as she can.

Therefore, one day, she offered a face-cloth to Duttabaung. Really it was the lower end of her htamein. The King used it and lost his power and glory. One day, Duttabaung traveling around the country by his royal barge. At the time, a dragon under water attacked his barge. The King couldn't fight back the dragon as he had lost his glory and he was eaten by the dragon. Finally, Panhtwar was successful in revenging Duttabaung. But, she did something so bad onto the King that the other wives saw and could not forgive her. So then the other queens harassed her to the point she killed herself.

Most of the child from Myanmar knew about her and they were in loved with Queen Panhtwar in their bed time story since they were young also. Queen Panhtwar was really brave queen who love her kingdom with her whole life.

Queen Pan Htwar's story as told by most Burmese

Pan Htwar was a strong queen whose Kingdom was wrongfully taken by the King of Sri Ksetra after manipulating her trust by pretending to be a monk. He forcefully took her as his wife and some says that he loved her deeply but she did not love him for everything he had done to her. With this, she vowed to take revenge and cursed a piece of cloth (most misogynists will say that it was her htamein or cloth for her genitals but remember that she is a sorceress) which she gave it to the King who lost his magic mole. The magic mole represented his power but as he lost it, he lost his abilities as well. With this, he was angered and so was his court. They ordered to kill Pan Htwar who cursed the land before taking her own life and legend has it that the area she died in has plants that can barely grow over a metre.

Spiritual life and worship

After she died, all of her history was carried on by the people throughout one generation to another. Some people said that she loved her kingdom so much that after she died, she became a goddess and she was taking care of the citizens in the kingdom with her spiritual powers. She is also the goddess of the deep forest, called Mahar Myaing. 

When the villager or the people who lived around that area, want something, they make a wish to her or worship her and all their wishes would become true.Til today, people still believe that she's real and so they have her statue and other duplicates of her all around Myanmar.When the people who worship her move to another area, they never forget to do another duplicate statue of her because they believe that if they keep their traditional worship on her, all the wishes will come true.During the Buddhist Lent, the villagers from Mhaw Zar and Mu Htaw villages would collect donations to fund a ceremony of worship for Panhtwar, held on the eve of the full moon day of Waso.

References

External links
 History of Queen Pan Htwar

Burmese nats
Burmese goddesses
City-states
Queens regnant in Asia
2nd-century BC women rulers
7th-century women rulers